The Free People's Party (Freie Volkspartei) was a short-lived political party in Germany. It was formed in 1956 by Franz Blücher, Fritz Neumayer and others, but the following year it merged into the German Party.

Defunct political parties in Germany
Political parties established in 1956
Political parties disestablished in 1957
Defunct liberal political parties